The prime minister of Hungary is the head of government of Hungary. The prime minister and the Cabinet are collectively accountable for their policies and actions to the Parliament, to their political party and ultimately to the electorate. The current holder of the office is Viktor Orbán, leader of the Fidesz – Hungarian Civic Alliance, who has served since 29 May 2010.

According to the Hungarian Constitution, the prime minister is nominated by the president of Hungary and formally elected by the National Assembly. Constitutionally, the president is required to nominate the leader of the political party who wins a majority of seats in the National Assembly as prime minister. If there is no party with a majority, the president holds an audience with the leaders of all parties represented in the assembly and nominates the person who is most likely to command a majority in the assembly, who is then formally elected by a simple majority of the assembly. In practice, when this situation occurs, the prime minister is the leader of the party winning a plurality of votes in the election, or the leader of the senior partner in the governing coalition.

Official title 
The title of Hungary's head of government in Hungarian is miniszterelnök. Literally translated, this means "minister-president". However, since "prime minister" or "premier" is the more usual title in a parliamentary system for a head of government in English-speaking nations, the title is translated as "prime minister" by most English sources.

History of the office

Palatine of Hungary 

Initially, he was in fact the representative of the king, later the vice-regent (viceroy). In the early centuries of the kingdom, he was appointed by the king, later elected by the Diet of the Kingdom of Hungary. After the Habsburgs solidified their hold of Hungary, the dignity became an appointed position once again. Finally, it became hereditary in a cadet (junior) branch of the Habsburg dynasty after King Francis appointed his brother Joseph.

Creation of the position 

During the Hungarian Revolution of 1848 the revolutionaries wanted the creation of a Hungarian cabinet which would be independent from the Austrian Empire and the Buda Chancellery (which was office of the imperial governor-general). One of the 12 points said: 2. A responsible government in Buda-Pest.

Ferdinand V appointed Count Lajos Batthyány for the position of prime minister of Hungary on 17 March 1848. The government was called ministry, differently from the current acceptation. The ministries were called departments. The position was vacant after the defeat of the freedom fight.

List of officeholders

See also
Records of prime ministers of Hungary
List of prime ministers of Hungary by tenure
List of prime ministers of Hungary (graphical)
List of heads of state of Hungary
List of Hungarian monarchs
List of palatines of Hungary

References

External links

 Official government Web site of the Office of the Prime Minister

 
Political history of Hungary
1848 establishments in Hungary